Lake Louisvilla is a neighborhood partially located in Louisville, Kentucky. It is located between Westport Road in Louisville and KY 22 in Oldham County. Lake Louisvilla was developed in the 1920s as a summer resort for people living in the city of Louisville. The state of Kentucky drained the lake in the late 1980s due to safety concerns regarding the stability of a dam.

References

External links
"Lake Louisvilla: 1920s Promotion, Hotel Recreation Enticed Vacationers to Resort; Depression Altered Its Course" — Article by Grace Schneider of The Courier-Journal

Neighborhoods in Louisville, Kentucky
1920s establishments in Kentucky
Populated places established in the 1920s